The Guadiela is a river in the Iberian Peninsula, a left-bank tributary of the Tagus and the latter's major upper-course tributary.

The hydronym Guadiela is formed by 'Guad' (of Arabic origin, conveying the meaning of "river") and the '-iela' suffix (a diminutive).

References 

Rivers of Castilla–La Mancha
Tributaries of the Tagus